Xinyi District or Sinyi District is a district of the city of Keelung, Taiwan.

Administrative divisions
The district administers 20 urban villages:
 Renshou, Renyi, Yizhao/Yijhao, Yixing/Yising, Yimin, Yihe, Zhihui/Jhihhuei, Zhicheng/Jhihcheng, Liyi, Lidong/Litung, Xinlu/Xinlv/Sinlyu, Dongxin/Dongsin/Tungxin, Dongguang/Tungguang, Dongming/Tungming, Dong-an/Dong'an/Tungan, Xiaoxian/Siaosian, Xiaozhong, Xiaode/Siaode, Xiaoshen/Siaoshen and Xiaogang/Siaogang Village.

Government institutions
 Keelung City Council

Education
 Chungyu University of Film and Arts

Tourist attractions
 Chung Cheng Park
 Embrace Cultural and Creative Park
 Gongzi Liao Fort
 Military Park

References

External links

  

Districts of Keelung